AstridBio Ltd. is a privately held Biotechnology company with office in Hungary. AstridBio's focus is biobanking software development, data management and analysis for genomics research. Its clients include academic research institutes, pharmaceutical and biotech companies.

Products
 SmartBiobank is a free, online biobank software designed to help clinicians, lab biologists and researchers to integrate translational research elements into one single system. SmartBiobank can store, manage and analyze biospecimen data, clinical data as well as experimental data.  It supports the establishment of population or clinical biobanks as well as patient registries.
 Disease Discovery Suites are based on the type of disease that is the focus of the investigation: chronic, rare, malignant and infectious diseases. The purpose of the suites is the biological interpretation of structured NGS data - assisting the researcher in revealing the genetic background of diseases or providing an answer to related research questions.
 GenoMiner is high-performance  IT platform for next generation sequencing data analysis for biologists with or without IT background.

Services
AstridBio has extensive experience in the following fields:
 bioinformatics, biostatistics, data analysis and data mining for high-throughput omics data, including genomics, transcriptomics, epigenomics, metagenomics, proteomics, metabolomics
 biobank systems for large-scale data gathering, data integration, visualization, and data interpretation

Projects
AstridBio has already been involved in many European research projects:
 My Health Avatar is an attempt at a proof of concept for the digital representation of patient health status. It is designed as a lifetime companion for individual citizens that will facilitate the collection of, and access to, long-term health-status information. This will be extremely valuable for clinical decisions and offer a promising approach to acquire population data to support clinical research, leading to strengthened multidisciplinary research excellence in supporting innovative medical care.
 Metagenome analysis of moss-associated microbiome project's aim is to explore and analyze the ecology of the area-specific community composition (the Alpine bog) with the help of metagenomic approaches using NGS technology.
 BIOREQ (Model Requirements for the Management of Biological Repositories) is a comprehensive guideline which covers the full range of research and operation activities applicable to biological repositories or biobanks.
 DRSCREEN (Developing a computer-based image processing system for diabetic retinopathy screening) project's aim is to develop an automated image analysing system for retinopathy screening (ophthalmological application).
 SCHIZO (Biobank based biomarker discovery and molecular mechanism research to support antipsychotic drug development) project's aim is to develop biomarkers and methods to support, rationalize and accelerate the discovery and development of novel drugs for the treatment of psychotic disorders. As a result, more effective drugs with fewer side effects than the existing ones can be put on the market.
 Joint Research on Melanoma Therapy project's aim is to develop a state-of-the-art bioinformatics tool to predict and optimize the expression profile and the behavioural pattern of the target melanoma cells effecting RNA-based vectors and to determine optimized RNA-based vectors for melanoma vaccination using the bioinformatic tool developed. Immunomodulation and direct targeting of signaling pathways in malignant melanoma are promising directions in melanoma therapy research.

See also
List of bioinformatics companies

References

Bioinformatics companies
Biotechnology companies of Hungary
Software companies of Hungary
Health care companies of Canada